Quetame is a municipality and town of Colombia in the Eastern Province, part of the department of Cundinamarca. The municipality borders Fómeque in the north, Fosca and Cáqueza in the west, the department of Meta in the east and in the south with Guayabetal.

Etymology 
The name Quetame comes from Chibcha and means "Our farmfields on the mountains".

History 
In the times before the Spanish conquest, Quetame was inhabited by the Muisca. Quetame was loyal to the cacique of Ubaque.

Modern Quetame was founded on June 26, 1826 by Josè Joaquin Guarín.

Economy 
Main economical activity of Quetame is agriculture with products beans, sagú, maize, peas, arracacha and others.

Earthquake 
On May 24, 2008, there was a magnitude 5.5 earthquake with its epicentre in Quetame that caused at least 3 deaths and destroyed 40% of the buildings in the village. The tremor was also felt in Bogotá and Villavicencio.

References 

Municipalities of Cundinamarca Department
Populated places established in 1826
1826 establishments in the Spanish Empire
Muisca Confederation
Muysccubun